The 2014–15 Mid-American Conference men's basketball season began with practices in October 2014, followed by the start of the 2014–15 NCAA Division I men's basketball season in November. Conference play began in January 2015 and concluded in March 2015. Buffalo, Kent State and Central Michigan shared the regular season title with a conference record of 12–6. Second-seeded Buffalo defeated top-seeded Central Michigan in the MAC tournament final and represented the MAC in the NCAA tournament where they lost to West Virginia.

Preseason awards
The preseason poll and league awards were announced by the league office on October 28, 2014.

Preseason men's basketball poll
(First place votes in parenthesis)

East Division
 Akron 117 (17)
 Ohio 92 (2)
 Kent State 66
 Buffalo 58
 Bowling Green 52 (1)
 Miami 35

West Division
 Toledo 118 (18)
 Western Michigan 94 (1)
 Eastern Michigan 68
 Northern Illinois 63
 Central Michigan 49 (1)
 Ball State 28

Tournament champs
Toledo (15), Akron (1), Bowling Green (1), Central Michigan (1), Ohio (1), Western Michigan (1)

Honors

Postseason

Mid–American tournament

NCAA tournament

Postseason awards

Coach of the Year: Keno Davis, Central Michigan
Player of the Year: Justin Moss, Buffalo
Freshman of the Year: Sean Sellers, Ball State
Defensive Player of the Year:  Richaun Holmes, Bowling Green
Sixth Man of the Year: Kris Brewer, Kent State

Honors

See also
2014–15 Mid-American Conference women's basketball season

References